"Lips Don't Lie" is a song by American singer Ally Brooke, featuring American rapper A Boogie wit da Hoodie. The single was released on May 24, 2019 through labels Atlantic Records and Latium Entertainment as the then-second single for Brooke's upcoming debut studio-album. The song was written by Artist Dubose, Oscar Görres, Brooke, Elof Loelv, and Madison Love, and produced by Loelv and Görres.

Background
Brooke said that she first heard the song in August 2018, and she wanted to record it as soon as she heard the first few seconds. She recorded the song on October 29, 2018. On May 15, 2019, Brooke posted a screenshot of herself listening to the song.

Music and lyrics
Rolling Stone wrote that "Lips Don't Lie" is a midtempo song featuring a "piano-driven beat beneath smoky vocals from Brooke". Brooke sings about "her lover’s kiss revealing all" while A Boogie wit da Hoodie "tells a different story on his verse, channeling jealousy and hurt feelings". While A Boogie wit da Hoodie does curse in the song, the explicit lyrics were censored in the final version of the song.

Music video 
The official music video for "Lips Don't Lie" was released alongside the single, on May 24, 2019. The video features Brooke sporting a number of lipstick shades and jewel-encrusted nails, singing the lyrics of the song to a zoomed-in camera; A Boogie wit da Hoodie also appears throughout the video and raps his verse later on. The cover art for the single was taken from a scene in the music video, as Brooke sports the same nails and one of the several lipsticks she wears in the video on the cover. As of February 2020, the video has accumulated over 10 million views on YouTube.

Charts

Weekly charts

Year-end charts

Release history

References

External links
 

2019 songs
2019 singles
Ally Brooke songs
A Boogie wit da Hoodie songs
Atlantic Records singles
Songs written by Madison Love
Songs written by Oscar Görres
Songs written by Elof Loelv
Songs written by A Boogie wit da Hoodie
Song recordings produced by Elof Loelv